Centrophthalmus is a genus of beetles in the subfamily Pselaphinae. Species have a palaearctic distribution in Eurasia and Asia.

References 

 Claude Besuchet, 1966. Revision des Centrophthalmus paléarctiques (Col. Pselaphidae). Mitteilungen der Schweizerischen Entomologischen Gesellschaft, 39, pages 59–65.

External links 

 
 Centrophthalmus at insectoid.info

Pselaphinae genera
Pselaphitae